Pizza Boli's is a pizzeria restaurant chain in the Mid-Atlantic headquartered in Pikesville, Maryland. Their first pizzeria was opened in the Mount Washington neighborhood of Baltimore, Maryland, in 1985. By 2013, there were 70 restaurants in Maryland, Virginia, Pennsylvania, and Washington, D.C. and 80 restaurants by 2019.

Recognition
In 2017, Pizza Boli's was rated #52 on the Pizza Today Top 100 Companies list with 2019 gross sales of $50,000,000 from its 80 restaurants. An outpost of the chain in the Adams-Morgan neighborhood of Washington, DC was a major purveyor of jumbo slices and participated in local disputes as to which restaurant served the most authentic slice to late-night revelers.

References

External links
 Chain of Pizza Boli's restaurants

1985 establishments in Maryland
American companies established in 1985
Companies based in Baltimore County, Maryland
Pizza chains of the United States
Regional restaurant chains in the United States
Restaurants established in 1985
Restaurants in Maryland
Restaurants in Washington, D.C.